Davida Kidd (born 1956) is a contemporary Canadian artist who specializes in print media and manipulated photography.

Work 
Kidd typically combines photography, printmaking, collage, and digital manipulation to create surreal images that blur the line between illusion and reality. She uses constructed sets and staged subjects to create large-scale photographic images that include multiple images and views.

Life 
Kidd was born in Edmonton, Alberta. She graduated with a Bachelor of Arts in Visual Communication Design from the University of Alberta in 1984, and a Master of Visual Arts with a specialization in Print Media from the University of Alberta in 1988. Kidd is currently an Associate Professor of Print Media at the University of the Fraser Valley in Abbotsford, British Columbia.

Awards 
Kidd was the winner of the Grand Prix at the 2003 International Print Triennial in Krakow, Poland.

Collections 
Kidd's work is in the collections of the Alberta Foundation for the Arts, the University of Alberta Permanent Art Collection, the Canada Council Art Bank, and the Surrey Art Gallery, amongst others.

Select exhibitions 

 Davida Kidd: Between the Subliminal and the Sublime (solo), International Cultural Centre, Krakow, Poland (2006)
 Debutante: Davida Kidd, Paula Scott, Lisa Hebden, Liz Carter, Two Rivers Gallery, Prince George, Canada (2007-8)
 Arena: the Art of Hockey, Art Gallery of Nova Scotia, Halifax, Canada (2008)
 Desire and Domination: Imagining the Psyche: Davida Kidd and Diana Thorneycroft, Nanaimo Art Gallery, Nanaimo, Canada (2008)
 Who Needs Art When You Have a View Like This (solo), Burnaby Art Gallery, Burnaby, Canada (2010)
 Game On! Art and Hockey, Richard F. Brush Gallery, St. Lawrence University, Canton, New York, USA (2013)
 From Time to Time: 50th Anniversary Print Portfolio, University of Alberta FAB Gallery, Edmonton, Alberta (2015)
 Views From the Southbank III: Information, Objects, Mappings, Surrey Art Gallery, Surrey, Canada (2015)
 High Resolution: Half a Century (1966-2015) of the International Print Triennial in Krakow, MODEM Centre for Modern and Contemporary Arts, Debrecen, Hungary (2016)
 Tales Untold: Chris Reid, Rebecca Chaperon, Davida Kidd, The Reach Gallery Museum, Abbotsford, Canada (2018)
 9th Annual International Printmaking Biennial, Douro, Portugal (2018)

References 

1956 births
Living people
Canadian women artists
Academic staff of the University of the Fraser Valley